A nonsense song is a type of song written mainly for the purpose of entertainment using nonsense syllables at least in the chorus. Such a song generally has a simple melody and a quick (or fairly quick) tempo and repeating sections.

History
The roots of this song type can be traced as far back as "Shoo, Fly, Don't Bother Me" and "Jimmy Crack Corn" to the 1890s "Ta-ra-ra Boom-de-ay". 

Every era has had its own nonsense songs. The turn of the 20th century had "Row, Row, Row", with lines like:

The jazz age created many nonsense songs, such as "Ja-Da".

Examples
 "Sarasponda", a children's folk song
 "Hold Tight (Want Some Seafood Mama)", written by Edward Robinson; Jerry Brandow; Lenny Kent; Leonard Ware; Willie Spottswood in 1938
 "Three Little Fishies", written by Josephine Carringer and Bernice Idins; with music by Saxie Dowell in 1939
 "Mairzy Doats", composed by Milton Drake, Al Hoffman and Jerry Livingston in 1943
 "Bibbidi-Bobbidi-Boo", written by Al Hoffman, Mack David, and Jerry Livingston in 1948
 "Hi-Lili, Hi-Lo", written by Helen Deutsch in 1952
 "Rubber Biscuit", written by Charles Johnson and first recorded by The Chips in 1956; later known from the Blues Brothers cover version.
 "Chim Chim Cher-ee", written by the Sherman Brothers in 1964
 "The Name Game", written by Shirley Ellis in 1964
 "Chitty Chitty Bang Bang", written by the Sherman Brothers in 1968
 "I Am the Walrus", written by John Lennon in 1967
 "Ob-La-Di, Ob-La-Da", written by Paul McCartney in 1968
 "Dig a Pony", written by John Lennon in 1969
 "Nonsense Song (Titine)" a song written by Charlie Chaplin, used in Modern Times
 "Surfin' Bird", written by Al Frazier, Carl White, Sonny Harris, Turner Wilson Jr. in 1963. Performed by The Trashmen and the Ramones.
 "Prisencolinensinainciusol", written by Adriano Celentano in 1972
 The Israeli rock band Kaveret, active 1973–1976, are known with their songs with nonsense, wordplays and surrealistic stories.
 "Hubba Hubba Zoot Zoot", by novelty band  Caramba, released in 1981 on the self-titled album. Other songs on the album are also of the same nonsense song genre.
 The closing theme song of the 1970s-80s sitcom WKRP in Cincinnati by Jim Ellis features gibberish lyrics.
 "Chacarron Macarron", written by "El Chombo" in 2006
 "Why This Kolaveri Di", an Indian song by actor Dhanush that skyrocketed him to international fame in 2011.
 "Ja Ja Ding Dong", a song from the 2020 film Eurovision Song Contest: The Story of Fire Saga
 Much of Foo Fighters' 1995 self-titled debut album is nonsense songs and verses.
 "Gibberish", from the 2003 Relient K album Two Lefts Don't Make a Right...but Three Do.

See also
 Denpa song
 Literary nonsense
 Novelty song

References

Song forms
Popular music
Nonsense
Music and humour